Shojaabad (also Romanized as Shojā‘ābād) is a village in Shirang Rural District, Kamalan District, Aliabad County, Golestan Province, Iran. At the 2006 census its population was 374, in 80 families.

References 

Populated places in Aliabad County